Brittney Ryan is an American New York Times bestselling author of children's fantasy novels with a Christmas theme.

Books

A reviewer from Publishers Weekly called The Legend of Holly Claus "a lush and leisurely Yuletide read." The debut of the Holly Claus series was published by HarperCollins as part of the Julie Andrews Collection along with children's books that were written by the actress Julie Andrews using the name Julie Andrews Edwards.

Series

Holly Claus
 The Legend of Holly Claus (novel) Julie Andrews Collection (2004)
 Holly Claus: The Christmas Princess Julie Andrews Collection (2007)

In 2015, a ballet company in Washington State presented Holly Claus: The Ballet of Dreams with a libretto written by Brittney Ryan. The ballet was directed and choreographed by Idalee Hutson-Fish.. As of 2020, film composer Laurent Eyquem was composing an original score to accompany a planned revival of the ballet.

In 2005, the United States Post Office recognized the fictionalized setting of the Holly Claus novels as an address. Children can send mail to Holly by addressing their letter to: "Holly Claus, The Royal Palace, The City of Forever, The Land of the Immortals." The Post Office has assigned The Land of Immortals its own zip code of 90209–1225. Ryan replies to the letters from the perspective of Holly Claus.

Awards
Ryan is a New York Times Best Selling author and Quill Award nominee for best book of the year 2005.

Personal life
Ryan is a native of Portland, Oregon.

References

21st-century American novelists
American children's writers
American women novelists
21st-century American women writers
American women children's writers
Year of birth missing (living people)
Living people
Writers from Portland, Oregon
University of Portland alumni
Novelists from Oregon